The 1960 edition of the Campeonato Carioca kicked off on July 24, 1960 and ended on December 18, 1960. It was organized by FCF (Federação Carioca de Futebol, or Carioca Football Federation). Twelve teams participated. América won the title for the 7th time, their last title to date. no teams were relegated.

System
The tournament would be disputed in a double round-robin format, with the team with the most points winning the title.

Championship

References

Campeonato Carioca seasons
Carioca